The Jefferson Davis Highway Marker is a commemorative marker on the Jefferson Davis Highway, in Hanover County, Virginia, near Ashland.  It is a  gray granite stone, with a slanted top, with two bronze plaques.  The Jefferson Davis Highway was conceived and marked by the United Daughters of the Confederacy, as a counter to the Lincoln Highway in the north, during 1913–1925.  In that era, named highways were being marked as automobile travel increased, and the advent of numbered highways eventually loomed. The marker was placed at the junction of what is now US Route 1 and Cedar Lane (Virginia Route 623), between Richmond and Ashland, in 1927. It has been moved twice: in the 1970s it was moved to accommodate the widening of Route 1, and it was moved across Route 1 in the 1980s.

The marker is one of a number of markers studied in a National Park Service study, UDC Commemorative Highway Markers along the Jefferson Davis Highway in Virginia.

See also
National Register of Historic Places listings in Hanover County, Virginia

References

Buildings and structures completed in 1927
Buildings and structures in Hanover County, Virginia
Individual signs on the National Register of Historic Places
Individual signs in the United States
Confederate States of America monuments and memorials in Virginia
Monuments and memorials on the National Register of Historic Places in Virginia
National Register of Historic Places in Hanover County, Virginia
Road transportation buildings and structures on the National Register of Historic Places
Transportation buildings and structures on the National Register of Historic Places in Virginia
Jefferson Davis Highway
United Daughters of the Confederacy monuments and memorials
1927 establishments in Virginia